Espoir FC may refer to several association football clubs:

 Espoir FC (Benin)
 Espoir FC (Niger)
 Espoir F.C. (Rwanda)
 Espoir FC de Mutimbuzi, Burundi
 Espoir de Labé, or Espoir FC, Guinea

See also
 Espoir Sportif de Jerba Midoun, Tunisia
 Espoir Tsevie, Togo
 Espoir de Saint-Louis, a defunct Senegalese club that merged with AS Saint-Louisienne to form ASC Linguère